This is a list of television programs that aired on Jetix around the world.

Jetix Animation Concepts
Jetix Animation Concepts was a joint-venture between Walt Disney Television Animation and Jetix Europe N.V. for producing shows that would air on Jetix channels and blocks all across the world.

 Super Robot Monkey Team Hyperforce Go! (2004)
 Get Ed (2005)
 Yin Yang Yo! (2006)

Jetix Europe co-produced shows
Shows co-produced by Jetix Europe N.V.

Note: Disney France owned 49% of SIP Animation (a former subsidiary of Saban Entertainment until 2002) which closed after the full acquisition of Jetix Europe N.V. in 2009
 The Tofus (2004) (co-produced with SIP Animation and CinéGroupe)
 W.I.T.C.H. (2004) (co-produced with SIP Animation and The Walt Disney Company)
 A.T.O.M. (2005) (co-produced with SIP Animation)
 Monster Warriors (2006) (co-produced with Coneybeare Stories, for YTV)
 Galactik Football (2006) (co-produced with Alphanim, Excluding Season 3)
 Shuriken School (2006) (co-produced with Xilam Animation and Zinkia Entertainment)
 Team Galaxy (2006) (co-produced with Marathon Media and Image Entertainment Corporation)
 Ōban Star-Racers (2006) (co-produced with Sav! The World Productions)
 Pucca (2006) (co-produced with Studio B Productions and VOOZ Character System)
 Monster Buster Club (2008) (co-produced with Marathon Media and Image Entertainment Corporation, for TF1 & YTV)
 Combo Niños (2008) (co-produced with SIP Animation)
 Kid vs. Kat (2008) (co-produced with Studio B Productions, Season 1 only for YTV)
 Jimmy Cool (2009) (co-produced with Breakthrough Entertainment and Mercury Filmworks, Season 1 only for Teletoon)

Jetix original broadcast series
The shows that premiered under the Jetix brand with Toon Disney but weren't produced by the network.

Note: Disney owned Saban Entertainment which held the Power Rangers franchise before being sold in 2010 after the closure of Jetix.

 Dragon Booster (premiered 2004, from CBC)
 Battle B-Daman (premiered 2005, from TV Tokyo)
 PXG (premiered January 2005)
 Captain Flamingo (premiered January 28, 2008, from YTV & GMA Network)
 Digimon Data Squad (premiered 2007, from Fuji TV)
 Power Rangers Dino Thunder (premiered February 14, 2004)
 Power Rangers S.P.D. (premiered February 5, 2005)
 Power Rangers Mystic Force (premiered February 20, 2006)
 Power Rangers Operation Overdrive (premiered February 26, 2007)
 Power Rangers Jungle Fury (premiered February 18, 2008)

Jetix Play 
This is a list of programs that aired on Jetix Play, a sister channel of Jetix that was available in Central Europe, Eastern Europe, and Middle East.

 Saban's Around the World in Eighty Dreams
 Saban's Adventures of Oliver Twist
 Saban's Gulliver's Travels
 Saban's Adventures of the Little Mermaid
 Button Nose
 Bad Dog
 Camp Candy
 Captain Flamingo
 The Kids from Room 402
 Dennis The Menace
 Diplodos
 The Secret Files of the Spy Dogs
 The Why Why Family
 The Tofus
 Gadget & the Gadgetinis
 Happy Ness: Secret of the Loch
 Heathcliff and the Catillac Cats
 Huckleberry Finn
 Inspector Gadget
 Jin Jin and the Panda Patrol
 Journey to the Heart of World
 Lady Lovely Locks and the Pixietails
 Little Wizards
 Bobby's World
 Little Mouse on the Prairie
 Saban's Adventures of Pinocchio
 Peter Pan and the Pirates
 Eek! The Cat
 Princess Sissi
 Princess Tenko and the Guardians of Magic
 Rainbow Brite
 Honeybee Hutch
 The Get Along Gang
 The Littl' Bits
 The Littles
 Three Little Ghosts
 Life With Louie
 Walter Melon
 Wunschpunsch

United States
For list of Jetix programs airing on Toon Disney and ABC Family, see List of programs broadcast by Jetix (block).

Marathons 
 Power Rangers Generations (premiered 2005) – selections from previous Power Rangers shows.

Europe
 Diabolik (1999–2001) (also aired on Fox Kids)
 The New Woody Woodpecker Show (2004–2009) (also aired on Fox Kids)
 Bobobo-bo Bo-bobo (2004 premiere; 1 season)
 Shin-chan (Vitello and Phuuz dubs)
 Captain Flamingo (2006 premiere; 3 seasons)
 Funky Cops
 Gadget & the Gadgetinis (2002)
 Hamtaro (2002)
 Iggy Arbuckle - acquired February 2007, to be broadcast from August 2007
 Iron Kid - bought from BRB Internacional for Jetix Latin America in January 2007; it was already showing in France and Spain
LazyTown
Magi-Nation (2008)
Let's Go Quintuplets!
One Piece (October 14, 2006 on Jetix Max Spain)
Pokémon (seasons 1–12)
Planet Sketch
Pretty Cure (October 14, 2006 on Jetix Max Spain) - Toei Animation
World of Quest (2008)
The Secret Files of the Spy Dogs
Urban Vermin
Sonic X
TutensteinWunschpunschYu-Gi-Oh! Duel MonstersYu-Gi-Oh! GXYu-Gi-Oh! 5D'sIndiaAmerican Dragon: Jake LongAryamaan – Brahmaand Ka YodhaDennis the MenaceDetective ConanDidi's Comedy Show (premiered May 7, 2007)Fantastic FourGargoylesGeorge of the JungleG.I. Joe: Sigma 6GoosebumpsHero - Bhakti Hi Shakti HaiThe Incredible HulkInspector GadgetMartin MysteryMonster WarriorsThe OwlPower Rangers Lightspeed RescuePower Rangers Lost GalaxyPower Rangers RPMPower Rangers Wild ForceRat-ManSo WeirdSpider-ManSpider-Man: The Animated SeriesSpider-Man and His Amazing FriendsSpider-Man UnlimitedStorm Hawks (premiered April 21, 2008)The OwlTotal Drama Island (premiered March 21, 2009)Tutenstein (premiered October 17, 2005)Urban Vermin (premiered April 21, 2008)Vicky & VetaalWorld of QuestWWE 24X7 (premiered May 7, 2007)X-MenZoranMovies20,000 Leagues Under the SeaThe Amazing ZorroCasperCasper: A Spirited BeginningCasper Meets WendyFinding NemoFlubberGargoyles the Movie: The Heroes AwakenGeorge of the JungleGeorge of the Jungle 2Herbie: Fully LoadedHalloweentownHulkInspector Gadget's Last CaseMonsters, Inc.Right on TrackSky HighTarzanX-MenLatin AmericaChaoticEon KidFunky CopsJibber JabberThe OwlWolverine and the X-MenUnited KingdomDinosaur KingFunky CopsGrossologyHuntik: Secrets & SeekersThe Owl''

See also
 List of programs broadcast by Fox Kids
 List of programs broadcast by Toon Disney
 List of programs broadcast by Disney XD

References

External links
Jetix Animation Concepts - The Big Cartoon Database listing

 
Jetix
Disney Channel related-lists